In My High School is the debut album of American country music artist Blaine Larsen. It was released on 1 June 2004 on the independent label, Giantslayer Records. Its lead-off single, "In My High School", also released in 2004 peaked at number 60 on the Billboard Hot Country Singles & Tracks (now Hot Country Songs).

Later in 2004, Larsen was signed to BNA Records, who re-issued the album on 25 January 2005 as Off to Join the World. One new song, "That's All I've Got to Say About That", was added to the album. Also, "If Merle Would Sing My Song", which was a solo rendition on the original album, was partially re-recorded with Merle Haggard appearing as a featured artist in the track that appeared on the new album.

"How Do You Get That Lonely" was issued as the second single from the Off to Join the World album. This song became the highest-charting song of Larsen's career, reaching number 18 on the country charts and number 91 on the Billboard Hot 100. Finally, in mid-2005, "The Best Man" was released as the third single, peaking at number 36 on the country charts.

Track listing

In My High School
The Best Man
In My High School
Teaching Me How to Love You
I've Been in Mexico
If Merle Would Sing My Song
Yesireebob
The Man He'll Never Be
That's Just Me
Off to Join the World (The Circus Song)
How Do You Get That Lonely

Personnel (In My High School)
 Eddie Bayers - drums
 Spady Brannan - bass guitar
 Larry Franklin - fiddle, mandolin
 Tommy Harden - drums
 Pete Huttlinger - acoustic guitar
 Mike Johnson - steel guitar
 Blaine Larsen - acoustic guitar, lead vocals
 Chris Leuzinger - electric guitar
 Sean Patrick McGraw - background vocals
 Joey Feek - background vocals on "Teaching Me How to Love You"
 Jimmy Nichols - piano, background vocals
 Russ Pahl - dobro
 Danny Parks - electric guitar
 Michael Rhodes - bass guitar
 Michael Spriggs - acoustic guitar
 Jonathan Yudkin - fiddle, mandolin

Off to Join the World

Personnel (Off to Join the World)

 Eddie Bayers - drums
 Bruce Bouton - steel guitar
 Spady Brannan - bass guitar
 J.T. Corenflos - electric guitar
 Rob Crosby - background vocals
 Stuart Duncan - fiddle, mandolin
 Larry Franklin - fiddle, mandolin
 Merle Haggard - duet vocals on "If Merle Would Sing My Song"
 Tommy Harden - drums
 Tony Harrell - keyboards
 Pete Huttlinger - acoustic guitar
 Mike Johnson - steel guitar
 Blaine Larsen - acoustic guitar, lead vocals
 Chris Leuzinger - electric guitar
 B. James Lowry - acoustic guitar
 Sean Patrick McGraw - background vocals
 Jerry McPherson - electric guitar
 Joey Martin - background vocals on "Teaching Me How to Love You"
 Jimmy Nichols - piano, background vocals
 Paul Overstreet - background vocals
 Russ Pahl - dobro
 Danny Parks - electric guitar
 Michael Rhodes - bass guitar
 Michael Spriggs - acoustic guitar
 Jonathan Yudkin - fiddle, mandolin

Chart performance

Weekly charts

Year-end charts

References

2004 debut albums
2005 albums
BNA Records albums
Blaine Larsen albums